This is a list of municipalities in Portugal which have standing links to local communities in other countries known as "town twinning" (usually in Europe) or "sister cities" (usually in the rest of the world).

A
Abrantes

 Hitoyoshi, Japan
 Parthenay, France
 Ribeira Brava, Cape Verde

Águeda

 Bissau, Guinea-Bissau
 Ferrol, Spain
 Madalena, Portugal
 Rio Grande, Brazil
 Sint-Gillis-Waas, Belgium

Alcobaça

 Aubergenville, France
 Bełchatów, Poland
 Cacuaco, Angola
 Chicopee, United States
 São João da Madeira, Portugal
 Tarouca, Portugal

Alcoutim
 Blain, France

Alfândega da Fé

 Medina de Rioseco, Spain
 Santa Cruz, Cape Verde

Aljezur

 Boa Vista, Cape Verde
 Kürnach, Germany

Aljustrel
 Hem, France

Almada

 Porto Amboim, Angola
 Regla (Havana), Cuba
 Sal, Cape Verde

Almeirim
 Dreux, France

Alpiarça

 Champigny-sur-Marne, France
 Wysokie Mazowieckie, Poland

Alvito
 Alvito, Italy

Amadora

 Aileu, East Timor

 Huambo, Angola
 Mosteiros, Cape Verde
 Piracicaba, Brazil
 Príncipe, São Tomé and Príncipe
 Tarrafal, Cape Verde

Amarante

 Achères, France
 Wiesloch, Germany

Anadia

 Boa Vista, Cape Verde
 Jūrmala, Latvia
 São Lourenço dos Órgãos, Cape Verde

Angra do Heroísmo

 Alenquer, Portugal
 Cartagena, Colombia
 Évora, Portugal
 Florianópolis, Brazil
 Funchal, Portugal
 Gilroy, United States
 Golegã, Portugal
 Gramado, Brazil
 Gustine, United States
 Jining, China
 Porto Novo, Cape Verde
 Ribeira Grande de Santiago, Cape Verde
 Salvador, Brazil
 São Vicente, Cape Verde
 Taunton, United States
 Tulare, United States

Ansião

 Erbach, Germany
 Mosteiros, Cape Verde
 Santos, Brazil
 São Vicente, Brazil

Arcos de Valdevez

 Dammarie-lès-Lys, France
 Décines-Charpieu, France

Arganil

 Beira, Mozambique
 Dudelange, Luxembourg
 Rio de Janeiro, Brazil
 Las Torres de Cotillas, Spain

Arouca

 Poligny, France
 Santos, Brazil

Arraiolos

 Maio, Cape Verde
 Meulan-en-Yvelines, France

Arruda dos Vinhos
 Mogente/Moixent, Spain

Aveiro

 Arcachon, France
 Belém, Brazil
 Bourges, France
 Cholargos, Greece
 Ciudad Rodrigo, Spain
 Cubatão, Brazil
 Farim, Guinea-Bissau
 Forlì, Italy
 Inhambane, Mozambique
 Mahdia, Tunisia
 Ōita, Japan
 Panyu (Guangzhou), China
 Pelotas, Brazil
 Pemba, Mozambique
 Santa Cruz, Cape Verde
 Santo António, São Tomé and Príncipe
 Viana do Castelo, Portugal

B
Barcelos

 El Jadida, Morocco
 Pontevedra, Spain

 São Domingos, Cape Verde
 Svishtov, Bulgaria
 Vierzon, France

Barreiro

 Łódź, Poland
 Stara Zagora, Bulgaria

Batalha

 Joinville-le-Pont, France
 Trujillo, Spain

Belmonte

 Belmonte, Brazil
 La Mézière, France
 Olímpia, Brazil
 Ouro Preto, Brazil
 Porto Seguro, Brazil
 Rosh Pinna, Israel
 Sal, Cape Verde
 Santa Cruz Cabrália, Brazil
 São José do Belmonte, Brazil
 São Paulo, Brazil
 São Vicente, Brazil

Braga

 Bissorã, Guinea-Bissau
 Clermont-Ferrand, France
 Cluj-Napoca, Romania
 Cuenca, Ecuador
 Ivano-Frankivsk, Ukraine
 Manaus, Brazil
 Puteaux, France
 Ribeira Brava, Cape Verde
 Rio de Janeiro, Brazil
 Santa Fe, Argentina
 Tarrafal de São Nicolau, Cape Verde

Bragança

 Água Grande, São Tomé and Príncipe
 La Bañeza, Spain
 Bragança Paulista, Brazil

 Gallicano, Italy
 Léon, Spain
 Les Pavillons-sous-Bois, France
 Zamora, Spain

C
Cabeceiras de Basto

 Boa Vista, Cape Verde
 Lalín, Spain
 Neuville-sur-Saône, France
 Quincieux, France
 Rives, France
 Sury-le-Comtal, France

Caldas da Rainha

 Badajoz, Spain
 Coria, Spain
 Huambo, Angola
 Lubango, Angola
 Perth Amboy, United States
 Poços de Caldas, Brazil
 Le Raincy, France
 Ribeira Grande, Cape Verde

Câmara de Lobos
 Forio, Italy

Caminha
 Pontault-Combault, France

Cantanhede

 Alfortville, France
 Cantanhede, Brazil

 Rio Maior, Portugal

Cartaxo

 Bento Gonçalves, Brazil
 Brava, Cape Verde
 Penglai (Yantai), China
 Pucioasa, Romania
 Słupsk, Poland

Cascais

 Atami, Japan
 Biarritz, France
 Campinas, Brazil
 Gaza City, Palestine
 Guarujá, Brazil
 Karşıyaka, Turkey
 Miami Beach, United States
 Pampilhosa da Serra, Portugal
 Sal, Cape Verde
 Santana, São Tomé and Príncipe
 Sausalito, United States
 Sinaia, Romania
 Ungheni, Moldova
 Vitória, Brazil
 Wuxi, China
 Xai-Xai, Mozambique

Castanheira de Pera
 Leimen, Germany

Castelo Branco

 Huambo, Angola
 Petrolina, Brazil
 Puławy, Poland
 Umuarama, Brazil
 Zhuhai, China

Castro Daire
 Zermatt, Switzerland

Castro Marim
 Guérande, France

Celorico de Basto

 Cambados, Spain
 Houilles, France
 Wiltz, Luxembourg

Chaves

 Angoulême, France
 Bafatá, Guinea-Bissau
 Differdange, Luxembourg
 Nampula, Mozambique
 Talence, France

Coimbra

 Aix-en-Provence, France
 Beira, Mozambique
 Cambridge, United States
 Curitiba, Brazil
 Daman, India
 Dili, East Timor
 Esch-sur-Alzette, Luxembourg
 Fez, Morocco
 Macau, China
 Padua, Italy
 Poitiers, France
 Salamanca, Spain
 Santa Clara, United States
 Santiago de Compostela, Spain
 Santos, Brazil
 São Vicente, Cape Verde
 Zaragoza, Spain

Condeixa-a-Nova

 Bretten, Germany
 Idanha-a-Nova, Portugal
 Longjumeau, France
 Pontypool, Wales, United Kingdom

Constância
 Fondettes, France

E
Entroncamento

 Mosteiros, Cape Verde
 Friedberg, Germany
 Penafiel, Portugal
 Villiers-sur-Marne, France

Évora

 Angra do Heroísmo, Portugal
 Chartres, France
 Island of Mozambique, Mozambique
 Suzdal, Russia

F
Fafe

 Porto Seguro, Brazil
 Sens, France

Faro

 Bolama, Guinea-Bissau
 Haikou, China
 Hayward, United States
 Huelva, Spain
 Maxixe, Mozambique
 Praia, Cape Verde
 Príncipe, São Tomé and Príncipe
 Tangier, Morocco

Felgueiras

 Boa Vista, Cape Verde
 Mocímboa da Praia, Mozambique
 Pont-Sainte-Maxence, France
 Santa Cruz Cabrália, Brazil

 São Vicente, Cape Verde

Figueira da Foz

 Angoche, Mozambique
 L'Aquila, Italy
 Ciudad Rodrigo, Spain
 Gradignan, France
 Mortágua, Portugal
 New Bedford, United States
 Praia, Cape Verde
 Yevpatoria, Ukraine

Figueira de Castelo Rodrigo
 Wissous, France

Funchal

 Angra do Heroísmo, Portugal
 Cape Town, South Africa
 Fremantle, Australia
 Gibraltar, Gibraltar
 Herzliya, Israel
 Honolulu, United States
 Ílhavo, Portugal
 Leichlingen, Germany
 Livingstone, Zambia
 Marrickville (Inner West), Australia
 Maui County, United States
 New Bedford, United States
 Oakland, United States
 Praia, Cape Verde
 Saint Helier, Jersey
 Santos, Brazil

G
Golegã

 Angra do Heroísmo, Portugal
 Villeneuve-d'Olmes, France

Gondomar

 Barton-upon-Humber, England, United Kingdom
 Feyzin, France
 Gondomar, Spain
 Praia, Cape Verde

Gouveia

 Danbury, United States
 Labouheyre, France
 Zofingen, Switzerland

Guarda

 Béjar, Spain
 Safed, Israel
 Siegburg, Germany
 Waterbury, United States
 Wattrelos, France

Guimarães

 Brive-la-Gaillarde, France
 Colonia del Sacramento, Uruguay
 Compiègne, France
 Dijon, France
 Igualada, Spain
 Kaiserslautern, Germany
 Lisbon, Portugal
 Londrina, Brazil
 Mé-Zóchi, São Tomé and Príncipe
 Montluçon, France
 Ribeira Grande de Santiago, Cape Verde
 Rio de Janeiro, Brazil
 Tacoronte, Spain

I
Idanha-a-Nova

 Condeixa-a-Nova, Portugal
 Hotton, Belgium
 Petrés, Spain
 Vert-le-Grand, France

Ílhavo

 Cabo Frio, Brazil
 Funchal, Portugal
 Grindavík, Iceland
 Ihtiman, Bulgaria
 New Bedford, United States
 Paraty, Brazil

L
Lagoa, Algarve

 Lagoa, Azores, Portugal
 Lepe, Spain
 São Domingos, Cape Verde

Lagoa, Azores

 Bristol, United States
 Dartmouth, United States
 Fairhaven, United States
 Fall River, United States
 Lagoa, Algarve, Portugal

 Rehoboth, United States
 Sainte-Thérèse, Canada
 Santa Cruz, Cape Verde
 Taunton, United States

Lagos

 Ksar el-Kebir, Morocco
 Palos de la Frontera, Spain
 Ribeira Grande, Portugal
 Ribeira Grande de Santiago, Cape Verde
 Torres Vedras, Portugal

Lamego
 Bouchemaine, France

Leiria

 Halton, England, United Kingdom
 Maringá, Brazil
 Olavarría, Argentina
 Olivenza, Spain
 Penglai (Yantai), China
 Quint-Fonsegrives, France
 Rheine, Germany
 Saint-Maur-des-Fossés, France
 Setúbal, Portugal
 Tokushima, Japan

Lisbon

 Bissau, Guinea-Bissau
 Budapest, Hungary
 Cacheu, Guinea-Bissau
 Fortaleza, Brazil
 Guimarães, Portugal
 Luanda, Angola
 Macau, China
 Madrid, Spain
 Malacca City, Malaysia
 Maputo, Mozambique
 Praia, Cape Verde
 Rabat, Morocco
 Rio de Janeiro, Brazil
 Salvador, Brazil
 São Tomé, São Tomé and Príncipe

Loulé

 Bissorã, Guinea-Bissau
 Boa Vista, Cape Verde
 Cartaya, Spain
 Créteil, France
 Le Puy-Notre-Dame, France

Loures

 Armamar, Portugal
 Diu, India
 Maio, Cape Verde
 Matola, Mozambique

Lourinhã

 Deuil-la-Barre, France
 Écully, France
 Sal, Cape Verde

Lousada

 Errenteria, Spain
 Tulle, France

M
Macedo de Cavaleiros
 Sal, Cape Verde

Madalena

 Águeda, Portugal
 Covilhã, Portugal
 Porto Novo, Cape Verde
 São Domingos, Cape Verde
 Vidigueira, Portugal

Maia

 Água Grande, São Tomé and Príncipe
 Andrézieux-Bouthéon, France
 Jiangmen, China
 Mantes-la-Jolie, France
 Mbombela, South Africa
 Nampula, Mozambique
 Ribeira Brava, Cape Verde
 Sal, Cape Verde
 Sault Ste. Marie, Canada
 Tarrafal de São Nicolau, Cape Verde

Manteigas

 Morlaàs, France
 Santa Cruz Cabrália, Brazil

Marco de Canaveses

 Príncipe, São Tomé and Príncipe
 Saint-Georges-lès-Baillargeaux, France

Marinha Grande

 Fontenay-sous-Bois, France
 Real Sitio de San Ildefonso, Spain
 Tarrafal, Cape Verde

Matosinhos

 Congonhas, Brazil
 Mansôa, Guinea-Bissau

 Nacala, Mozambique
 São Filipe, Cape Verde
 Vilagarcía de Arousa, Spain

Mêda
 Saint-Aubin, Switzerland

Mira
 Lagny-sur-Marne, France

Miranda do Corvo

 Neufchâteau, France
 Santa Catarina do Fogo, Cape Verde

Miranda do Douro

 Aranda de Duero, Spain
 Bimenes, Spain

Mirandela

 Bafatá, Guinea-Bissau
 Orthez, France

Mogadouro
 Ploumagoar, France

Moita

 Pinhel, Portugal
 Plaisir, France
 Tarrafal, Cape Verde

Monção

 Redondela, Spain
 Salvaterra de Miño, Spain
 Tarascon-sur-Ariège, France
 Vigneux-sur-Seine, France

Montemor-o-Velho

 Cerizay, France
 São José dos Pinhais, Brazil
 Xai-Xai, Mozambique

Mortágua

 Figueira da Foz, Portugal
 Wormeldange, Luxembourg

N
Nazaré

 Badajoz, Spain
 Capbreton, France
 Consdorf, Luxembourg
 Nogent-sur-Marne, France

O
Óbidos
 Gramado, Brazil

Oeiras

 Benguela, Angola
 Gebze, Turkey
 Inhambane, Mozambique
 Mohammedia, Morocco
 Oeiras, Brazil
 Príncipe, São Tomé and Príncipe
 Quinhámel, Guinea-Bissau
 Saint-Étienne, France
 São Vicente, Cape Verde

Oleiros
 Saint-Doulchard, France

Oliveira do Bairro

 Benguela, Angola
 Lamballe, France

Ourém

 Altötting, Germany
 Barueri, Brazil
 Częstochowa, Poland
 Lourdes, France
 Monapo, Mozambique
 Pitești, Romania
 Le Plessis-Trévise, France
 Raseiniai, Lithuania
 San Giovanni Rotondo, Italy
 São Filipe, Cape Verde
 Selçuk, Turkey
 Uherský Brod, Czech Republic

P
Paços de Ferreira
 Sartrouville, France

Paredes de Coura
 Cenon, France

Penamacor
 Clamart, France

Pinhel

 Guijuelo, Spain
 Moita, Portugal

Ponta Delgada

 Caué, São Tomé and Príncipe
 Fall River, United States
 Florianópolis, Brazil
 Kauai County, United States
 Newport, United States
 Pleven, Bulgaria
 Praia, Cape Verde
 San Leandro, United States

Ponte da Barca
 Les Clayes-sous-Bois, France

Ponte de Lima

 Châlette-sur-Loing, France
 Vandœuvre-lès-Nancy, France
 Xinzo de Limia, Spain

Ponte de Sor

 Aiud, Romania
 Tarrafal, Cape Verde

Porto

 Beira, Mozambique
 Bordeaux, France
 Bristol, England, United Kingdom
 Duruelo de la Sierra, Spain
 Jena, Germany
 Lembá, São Tomé and Príncipe
 León, Spain
 Liège, Belgium
 Luanda, Angola
 Macau, China
 Marsala, Italy
 Nagasaki, Japan
 Ndola, Zambia
 Recife, Brazil
 Santos, Brazil
 São Vicente, Cape Verde
 Shanghai, China
 Shenzhen, China
 Timișoara, Romania
 Vigo, Spain

Póvoa de Varzim

 Eschborn, Germany
 Montgeron, France

Povoação

 Dartmouth, United States
 Tarrafal, Cape Verde

R
Ribeira Grande

 East Providence, United States
 Fall River, United States
 Laval, Canada
 Paul, Cape Verde
 Porto Alegre, Brazil
 Porto Novo, Cape Verde
 Ribeira Grande, Cape Verde
 Ribeira Grande de Santiago, Cape Verde

S
Santa Maria da Feira

 Catió, Guinea-Bissau
 Joué-lès-Tours, France
 Kenitra, Morocco
 Targovishte, Bulgaria

Santarém

 Badajoz, Spain
 Brava, Cape Verde
 Covilhã, Portugal
 Fulacunda, Guinea-Bissau
 Grândola, Portugal
 Lubango, Angola
 Meknes, Morocco
 Santarém, Brazil
 São Vicente, Brazil
 Târgoviște, Romania
 Tiraspol, Moldova

Santiago do Cacém

 Santiago de Compostela, Spain
 Szombathely, Hungary

Santo Tirso

 Alcázar de San Juan, Spain
 Cantagalo, São Tomé and Príncipe
 Celanova, Spain
 Clichy, France
 Groß-Umstadt, Germany
 Mâcon, France
 Nova Friburgo, Brazil
 Saint-Péray, France

São João da Madeira

 Alcobaça, Portugal
 Maio, Cape Verde
 Nampula, Mozambique
 Novo Hamburgo, Brazil
 Viana, Angola

São Pedro do Sul
 Villeneuve-le-Roi, France

Seia
 Domfront-en-Poiraie, France

Seixal

 Assis Chateaubriand, Brazil
 Beira, Mozambique
 Boa Vista, Cape Verde
 Lobata, São Tomé and Príncipe
 Lobito, Angola

Sernancelhe
 Jacou, France

Sesimbra is a member of the Douzelage, a town twinning association of towns across the European Union. Sesimbra also has one other twin town.

Douzelage
 Agros, Cyprus
 Altea, Spain
 Asikkala, Finland
 Bad Kötzting, Germany
 Bellagio, Italy
 Bundoran, Ireland
 Chojna, Poland
 Granville, France
 Holstebro, Denmark
 Houffalize, Belgium
 Judenburg, Austria
 Kőszeg, Hungary
 Marsaskala, Malta
 Meerssen, Netherlands
 Niederanven, Luxembourg
 Oxelösund, Sweden
 Preveza, Greece
 Rokiškis, Lithuania
 Rovinj, Croatia
 Sherborne, England, United Kingdom
 Sigulda, Latvia
 Siret, Romania
 Škofja Loka, Slovenia
 Sušice, Czech Republic
 Tryavna, Bulgaria
 Türi, Estonia
 Zvolen, Slovakia
Other
 São Filipe, Cape Verde

Setúbal

 Beauvais, France
 Debrecen, Hungary
 Leiria, Portugal
 Quelimane, Mozambique
 Pau, France
 Porto Seguro, Brazil
 Safi, Morocco
 Tordesillas, Spain

Sines

 Pemba, Mozambique
 Santa Cruz, Cape Verde

Sintra

 Asilah, Morocco
 Beira, Mozambique
 Bissau, Guinea-Bissau
 Fontainebleau, France
 Goussainville, France
 Honolulu, United States
 El Jadida, Morocco
 Lobito, Angola
 Namaacha, Mozambique
 Nova Sintra, Cape Verde
 Old Havana (Havana), Cuba
 Ōmura, Japan
 Oviedo, Spain
 Petrópolis, Brazil
 Trindade (Mé-Zóchi), São Tomé and Príncipe

Soure
 Neuville-de-Poitou, France

Soure – Samuel is a member of the Charter of European Rural Communities, a town twinning association across the European Union, alongside with:

 Bienvenida, Spain
 Bièvre, Belgium
 Bucine, Italy
 Cashel, Ireland
 Cissé, France
 Desborough, England, United Kingdom
 Esch (Haaren), Netherlands
 Hepstedt, Germany
 Ibănești, Romania
 Kandava (Tukums), Latvia
 Kannus, Finland
 Kolindros, Greece
 Lassee, Austria
 Medzev, Slovakia
 Moravče, Slovenia
 Næstved, Denmark
 Nagycenk, Hungary
 Nadur, Malta
 Ockelbo, Sweden
 Pano Lefkara, Cyprus
 Põlva, Estonia
 Slivo Pole, Bulgaria
 Starý Poddvorov, Czech Republic
 Strzyżów, Poland
 Tisno, Croatia
 Troisvierges, Luxembourg
 Žagarė (Joniškis), Lithuania

T
Tarouca

 Alcobaça, Portugal
 Paraíso do Tocantins, Brazil

Tavira

 Kenitra, Morocco
 Łańcut, Poland
 Perpignan, France
 Porto Novo, Cape Verde
 Punta Umbría, Spain
 San Bartolomé de la Torre, Spain

Tomar

 Hadera, Israel
 Ribeira Grande de Santiago, Cape Verde
 Vincennes, France

Tondela
 Lannemezan, France

Torres Novas

 Moreni, Romania 
 Rambouillet, France
 Ribeira Grande, Cape Verde

Torres Vedras

 Lagos, Portugal
 Villenave-d'Ornon, France
 Wellington, England, United Kingdom

V
Vale de Cambra
 Mondorf-les-Bains, Luxembourg

Valpaços

 Bettembourg, Luxembourg
 La Garenne-Colombes, France

Viana do Alentejo

 Igarassu, Brazil
 Porto Seguro, Brazil
 Viana, Brazil

Viana do Castelo

 Alagoas, Brazil
 Aveiro, Portugal
 Cabedelo, Brazil
 Hendaye, France
 Igarassu, Brazil
 Itajaí, Brazil

 Lugo, Spain
 Matola, Mozambique
 Pessac, France
 Porto Seguro, Brazil
 Ribeira Grande, Cape Verde
 Rio de Janeiro, Brazil
 Riom, France
 Viana, Brazil

Vila do Bispo

 Baiona, Spain
 Cape Canaveral, United States
 Nishinoomote, Japan
 Santa Fe, Spain

Vila do Conde

 Le Cannet, France
 Ferrol, Spain
 Olinda, Brazil
 Portalegre, Portugal

Vila Franca de Xira

 Santa Catarina, Cape Verde
 Tarrafal, Cape Verde
 Villejuif, France

Vila Nova da Barquinha

 Dissay, France
 Madone, Italy
 Rio Maior, Portugal
 Santa Catarina do Fogo, Cape Verde

Vila Nova de Poiares

 Caué, São Tomé and Príncipe
 Douchy-les-Mines, France
 Lichinga, Mozambique
 Liquiçá, East Timor
 Maio, Cape Verde
 Mielec, Poland

Vila Pouca de Aguiar
 Bettendorf, Luxembourg

Vila Real

 Espinho, Portugal
 Grasse, France
 Mende, France

 Osnabrück, Germany
 Ourense, Spain

Vila Verde

 Lohmar, Germany
 Petit-Couronne, France
 Saint-Mandé, France

Viseu

 Abidjan, Ivory Coast
 Arezzo, Italy
 Campinas, Brazil
 Cantagalo, São Tomé and Príncipe
 Haskovo, Bulgaria
 Lublin, Poland
 Marly-le-Roi, France
 Matola, Mozambique
 Rio de Janeiro, Brazil
 Santos, Brazil
 São Filipe, Cape Verde

Vizela

 Caldas de Reis, Spain
 Frontignan, France

References

External links
Twin towns (Associação Nacional de Municípios Portugueses)

Portugal
Portugal geography-related lists
Foreign relations of Portugal
Cities in Portugal
Populated places in Portugal